Hanna Kravchenko (born 25 June 1986) is a Ukrainian rower. She competed in the women's double sculls event at the 2012 Summer Olympics.

References

External links
 

1986 births
Living people
Ukrainian female rowers
Olympic rowers of Ukraine
Rowers at the 2012 Summer Olympics
Sportspeople from Dnipro
21st-century Ukrainian women